Razawin Linka is an Arakanese (Rakhine) chronicle covering the history of Arakan.

References

Bibliography
 

Burmese chronicles